Abalone ( or ; via Spanish , from  Rumsen aulón) is a common name for any of a group of small to very large marine gastropod molluscs in the family Haliotidae. Other common names are ear shells, sea ears, and, rarely, muttonfish or muttonshells in parts of Australia, ormer in the UK, perlemoen in South Africa, and paua in New Zealand. Abalones are marine snails. Their taxonomy puts them in the family Haliotidae, which contains only one genus, Haliotis, which once contained six subgenera. These subgenera have become alternative representations of Haliotis. The number of species recognized worldwide ranges between 30 and 130 with over 230 species-level taxa described. The most comprehensive treatment of the family considers 56 species valid, with 18 additional subspecies. The shells of abalones have a low, open spiral structure, and are characterized by several open respiratory pores in a row near the shell's outer edge. The thick inner layer of the shell is composed of nacre (mother-of-pearl), which in many species is highly iridescent, giving rise to a range of strong, changeable colors which make the shells attractive to humans as decorative objects, jewelry, and as a source of colorful mother-of-pearl.

The flesh of abalones is widely considered to be a desirable food, and is consumed raw or cooked by a variety of cultures.

Description

The largest species,  Haliotis rufescens, reaches .

The shell of abalones is convex, rounded to oval in shape, and may be highly arched or very flattened. The shell of the majority of species has a small, flat spire and two to three whorls. The last whorl, known as the body whorl, is auriform, meaning that the shell resembles an ear, giving rise to the common name "ear shell". Haliotis asinina has a somewhat different shape, as it is more elongated and distended. The shell of Haliotis cracherodii cracherodii is also unusual as it has an ovate form, is imperforate, shows an exserted spire, and has prickly ribs.

A mantle cleft in the shell impresses a groove in the shell, in which are the row of holes characteristic of the genus. These holes are respiratory apertures for venting water from the gills and for releasing sperm and eggs into the water column. They make up what is known as the selenizone, which forms as the shell grows. This series of eight to 38 holes is near the anterior margin. Only a small number is generally open. The older holes are gradually sealed up as the shell grows and new holes form. Each species has a typical number of open holes, between four and 10, in the selenizone. An abalone has no operculum. The aperture of the shell is very wide and nacreous.

The exterior of the shell is striated and dull. The color of the shell is very variable from species to species, which may reflect the animal's diet. The iridescent nacre that lines the inside of the shell varies in color from silvery white, to pink, red and green-red to deep blue, green to purple.

The animal has fimbriated head lobes and side lobes that are fimbriated and cirrated. The radula has small median teeth, and the lateral teeth are single and beam-like. They have about 70 uncini, with denticulated hooks, the first four very large. The rounded foot is very large in comparison to most molluscs. The soft body is coiled around the columellar muscle, and its insertion, instead of being on the columella, is on the middle of the inner wall of the shell. The gills are symmetrical and both well developed.

These snails cling solidly with their broad, muscular foot to rocky surfaces at sublittoral depths, although some species such as Haliotis cracherodii used to be common in the intertidal zone. Abalones reach maturity at a relatively small size. Their fecundity is high and increases with their size, laying from 10,000 to 11 million eggs at a time. The spermatozoa are filiform and pointed at one end, and the anterior end is a rounded head.

The adults provide no further assistance to the larvae and they are described as lecithotrophic. The adults are herbivorous and feed with their rhipidoglossan radula on macroalgae, preferring red or brown algae.

Distribution

The haliotid family has a worldwide distribution, along the coastal waters of every continent, except the Pacific coast of South America, the Atlantic coast of North America, the Arctic, and Antarctica. The majority of abalone species are found in cold waters, such as off the coasts of New Zealand, South Africa, Australia, Western North America, and Japan.

Structure and properties of the shell
The shell of the abalone is exceptionally strong and is made of microscopic calcium carbonate tiles stacked like bricks. Between the layers of tiles is a clingy protein substance. When the abalone shell is struck, the tiles slide instead of shattering and the protein stretches to absorb the energy of the blow. Material scientists around the world are studying this tiled structure for insight into stronger ceramic products such as body armor. The dust created by grinding and cutting abalone shell is dangerous; appropriate safeguards must be taken to protect people from inhaling these particles.

Diseases and pests
Abalones are subject to various diseases. The Victorian Department of Primary Industries said in 2007 that ganglioneuritis killed up to 90% of stock in affected regions. Abalone are also severe hemophiliacs as their fluids will not clot in the case of a laceration or puncture wound. Members of the Spionidae of the polychaetes are known as pests of abalone.

Human use
Abalone has been harvested worldwide for centuries as a source of food and decorative items. Abalone shells and associated materials, like their claw-like pearls and nacre, have been used as jewelry and for buttons, buckles, and inlay.  These shells have been found in archaeological sites around the world, ranging from 100,000-year-old deposits at Blombos Cave in South Africa to historic Chinese abalone middens on California's Northern Channel Islands.  For at least 12,000 years, abalones were harvested to such an extent around the Channel Islands that shells in the area decreased in size four thousand years ago.

Farming

Farming of abalone began in the late 1950s and early 1960s in Japan and China. Since the mid-1990s, there have been many increasingly successful endeavors to commercially farm abalone for the purpose of consumption. Overfishing and poaching have reduced wild populations to such an extent that farmed abalone now supplies most of the abalone meat consumed. The principal abalone farming regions are China, Taiwan, Japan, and Korea. Abalone is also farmed in Australia, Canada, Chile, France, Iceland, Ireland, Mexico, Namibia, New Zealand, South Africa, Spain, Thailand, and the United States.

After trials in 2012, a commercial "sea ranch" was set up in Flinders Bay, Western Australia to raise abalone. The ranch is based on an artificial reef made up of 5,000 separate concrete abalone habitat units, which can host 400 abalone each. The reef is seeded with young abalone from an onshore hatchery.

The abalone feed on seaweed that grows naturally on the habitats; the ecosystem enrichment of the bay also results in growing numbers of dhufish, pink snapper, wrasse, and Samson fish among other species.

Consumption
Abalones have long been a valuable food source for humans in every area of the world where a species is abundant. The meat of this mollusc is considered a delicacy in certain parts of Latin America (particularly Chile), France, New Zealand, East Asia and Southeast Asia. In the Greater China region and among Overseas Chinese communities, abalone is commonly known as bao yu, and sometimes forms part of a Chinese banquet. In the same way as shark fin soup or bird's nest soup, abalone is considered a luxury item, and is traditionally reserved for special occasions such as weddings and other celebrations.

As abalone became more popular and less common, the prices adjusted accordingly. In the 1920s, a restaurant-served portion of abalone, about 4 ounces, would cost (in inflation adjusted dollars) about US$7; by 2004, the price had risen to US$75. In the United States, prior to this time, abalone was predominantly eaten, gathered, and prepared by Chinese immigrants. Before that, abalone were collected to be eaten, and used for other purposes by Native American tribes. By 1900, laws were passed in California to outlaw the taking of abalone above the intertidal zone. This forced the Chinese out of the market and the Japanese perfected diving, with or without gear, to enter the market. Abalone started to become popular in the USA after the Panama–Pacific International Exposition in 1915, which exhibited 365 varieties of fish with cooking demonstrations, and a 1300-seat dining hall.

In Japan, live and raw abalones are used in awabi sushi, or served steamed, salted, boiled, chopped, or simmered in soy sauce. Salted, fermented abalone entrails are the main component of tottsuru, a local dish from Honshū. Tottsuru is mainly enjoyed with sake.

In South Korea, abalone is called Jeonbok (/juhn-bok/) and used in various recipes. Jeonbok porridge and Pan-fried abalone steak with butter are popular but also commonly used in soups or ramyeon.

In California, abalone meat can be found on pizza, sautéed with caramelized mango, or in steak form dusted with cracker meal and flour.

Sport harvesting

Australia
Tasmania supplies about 25% of the yearly world abalone harvest. Around 12,500 Tasmanians recreationally fish for blacklip and greenlip abalone. With a recreational abalone licence, the bag limit is 10 per day, with a total possession limit of 20. Scuba diving for abalone is allowed, and has a rich history in Australia. (Scuba diving for abalone in the states of New South Wales and Western Australia is illegal; a free-diving catch limit of two is allowed).

Victoria has had an active abalone fishery since the late 1950s. The state is sectioned into three fishing zones, Eastern, Central and Western, with each fisher required a zone-allocated licence. Harvesting is performed by divers using surface-supplied air "hookah" systems operating from runabout-style, outboard-powered boats. While the diver seeks out colonies of abalone amongst the reef beds, the deckhand operates the boat, known as working "live" and stays above where the diver is working. Bags of abalone pried from the rocks are brought to the surface by the diver or by way of "shot line", where the deckhand drops a weighted rope for the catch bag to be connected then retrieved. Divers measure each abalone before removing from the reef and the deckhand remeasures each abalone and removes excess weed growth from the shell. Since 2002, the Victorian industry has seen a significant decline in catches, with the total allowable catch reduced from 1440 to 787 tonnes for the 2011/12 fishing year, due to dwindling stocks and most notably the abalone virus ganglioneuritis, which is fast-spreading and lethal to abalone stocks.

United States

Sport harvesting of red abalone is permitted with a California fishing license and an abalone stamp card. In 2008, the abalone card also came with a set of 24 tags. This was reduced to 18 abalone per year in 2014, and as of 2017 the limit has been reduced to 12, only nine of which may be taken south of Mendocino County. Legal-size abalone must be tagged immediately. Abalone may only be taken using breath-hold techniques or shorepicking; scuba diving for abalone is strictly prohibited. Taking of abalone is not permitted south of the mouth of San Francisco Bay. A size minimum of  measured across the shell is in place.  A person may be in possession of only three abalone at any given time.

As of 2017, abalone season is May to October, excluding July. Transportation of abalone may only legally occur while the abalone is still attached in the shell. Sale of sport-obtained abalone is illegal, including the shell. Only red abalone may be taken, as black, white, pink, flat, green, and pinto abalone are protected by law. In 2018, The California Fish and Game Commission closed recreational abalone season due to dramatically declining populations. That year, they extended the moratorium to last through April 2021.

An abalone diver is normally equipped with a thick wetsuit, including a hood, bootees, and gloves, and usually also a mask, snorkel, weight belt, abalone iron, and abalone gauge. Alternatively, the rock picker can feel underneath rocks at low tides for abalone. Abalone are normally found on rocks near food sources such as kelp. An abalone iron is used to pry the abalone from the rock before it has time to fully clamp down. Divers dive from boats, kayaks, tube floats, or directly off the shore.

The mollusc Concholepas concholepas is often sold in the United States under the name "Chilean abalone", though it is not an abalone, but a muricid.

New Zealand

In New Zealand, abalone is called paua (from the Māori language). Haliotis iris (or blackfoot paua) is the ubiquitous New Zealand paua, the highly polished nacre of which is extremely popular as souvenirs with its striking blue, green, and purple iridescence. Haliotis australis and Haliotis virginea are also found in New Zealand waters, but are less popular than H. iris.

Like all New Zealand shellfish, recreational harvesting of paua does not require a permit provided catch limits, size restrictions, and seasonal and local restrictions set by the Ministry for Primary Industries (MPI) are followed. Paua can only be caught by free-diving; it is illegal to catch them using scuba gear.

An extensive global black market exists in collecting and exporting abalone meat. This can be a particularly awkward problem where the right to harvest paua can be granted legally under Māori customary rights. When such permits to harvest are abused, it is frequently difficult to police. The limit is strictly enforced by roving Ministry for Primary Industries fishery officers with the backing of the New Zealand Police.  Poaching is a major industry in New Zealand with many thousands being taken illegally, often undersized. Convictions have resulted in seizure of diving gear, boats, and motor vehicles and fines and in rare cases, imprisonment.

South Africa
The largest abalone in South Africa, Haliotis midae, occurs along roughly two-thirds of the country's coastline. Abalone-diving has been a recreational activity for many years, but stocks are currently being threatened by illegal commercial harvesting. In South Africa, all persons harvesting this shellfish need permits that are issued annually, and no abalone may be harvested using scuba gear.

For the last few years, however, no permits have been issued for collecting abalone, but commercial harvesting still continues as does illegal collection by syndicates.
In 2007, because of widespread poaching of abalone, the South African government listed abalone as an endangered species according to the CITES section III appendix, which requests member governments to monitor the trade in this species. This listing was removed from CITES in June 2010 by the South African government and South African abalone is no longer subject to CITES trade controls. Export permits are still required, however.
The abalone meat from South Africa is prohibited for sale in the country to help reduce poaching; however, much of the illegally harvested meat is sold in Asian countries. As of early 2008, the wholesale price for abalone meat was approximately US$40.00 per kilogram. There is an active trade in the shells, which sell for more than US$1,400 per tonne.

Channel Islands, Brittany and Normandy 
Ormers (Haliotis tuberculata) are considered a delicacy in the British Channel Islands as well as in adjacent areas of France, and are pursued with great alacrity by the locals. This, and a recent lethal bacterial disease, has led to a dramatic depletion in numbers since the latter half of the 19th century, and "ormering" is now strictly regulated to preserve stocks. The gathering of ormers is now restricted to a number of 'ormering tides', from 1 January to 30 April, which occur on the full or new moon and two days following. No ormers may be taken from the beach that are under  in shell length. Gatherers are not allowed to wear wetsuits or even put their heads underwater. Any breach of these laws is a criminal offence and can lead to a fine of up to £5,000 or six months in prison. The demand for ormers is such that they led to the world's first underwater arrest, when Mr. Kempthorne-Leigh of Guernsey was arrested by a police officer in full diving gear when illegally diving for ormers.

Decorative items 

The highly iridescent inner nacre layer of the shell of abalone has traditionally been used as a decorative item, in jewelry, buttons, and as inlay in furniture and musical instruments, such as on fret boards and binding of guitars.

Indigenous use 
Abalone has been an important staple in a number of Indigenous cultures around the world, specifically in Africa and on the Northwest American coast. The meat is a traditional food, and the shell is used to make ornaments; historically, the shells were also used as currency in some communities.

Threat of extinction
Abalones are one of the many classes of organism threatened with extinction due to overfishing and the acidification of oceans from anthropogenic carbon dioxide, as reduced pH erodes their shells. In the 21st century, white, pink, and green abalone are on the United States federal endangered species list, and possible restoration sites have been proposed for the San Clemente Island and Santa Barbara Island areas. The possibility of farming abalone to be reintroduced into the wild has also been proposed, with these abalone having special tags to help track the population.

Species

The number of species that are recognized within the genus Haliotis has fluctuated over time, and depends on the source that is consulted. The number of recognized species range from 30 to 130. This list finds a compromise using the WoRMS database, plus some species that have been added, for a total of 57. The majority of abalone have not been rated for conservation status. Those that have been reviewed tend to show that the abalone in general is an animal that is declining in numbers, and will need protection throughout the globe.

Synonyms

See also

 List of delicacies

Citations

References

Further reading

External links

 
 Abalone: Species Diversity
 ABMAP: The Abalone Mapping Project
 Abalone biology
 Conchology
 Hardy's Internet Guide to Marine Gastropods : Shell Catalog
 book on crafting with Abalone Shell 
 Fisheries Western Australia – Abalone Fact Sheet
 Imagemap of worldwide abalone distribution
 Oman’s Abalone Harvest 
  Pro abalone diver, Mallacoota, Victoria (1967)
  Tathra NSW(1961), Abalone (1963)
 Fathom magazine "The Abalone Divers" Pages 43,44,45  (1972)
 Abalone Healing Properties

 
Commercial molluscs
Extant Late Cretaceous first appearances
Organic gemstones
Mollusc common names
Taxa named by Carl Linnaeus

de:Seeohren  
ja:アワビ#人間との関わり
zh:鮑魚